Merkin R. Valdéz Mola (born November 10, 1981) is a Dominican former professional baseball pitcher. Valdez graduated from Escuela Rural Palenque High School in his native Dominican Republic.

Career

Atlanta Braves
Valdez was signed by the Atlanta Braves as an amateur free agent in 1999. He played with the Braves Dominican League team in 2000 and 2001 and the Gulf Coast Braves in 2002.

San Francisco Giants
He was traded by the Braves with Damian Moss to the San Francisco Giants for Russ Ortiz on December 17, 2002. He  was named San Francisco's Minor League Player of the Year and selected as a Low A All-Star in 2003 when he went 9–5 with a 2.25 ERA for the Hagerstown Suns in the South Atlantic League.  In 2004, Valdez pitched for Single-A San Jose Giants, Double-A Norwich Navigators, Triple-A Fresno Grizzlies, and made his Major League debut on August 1, 2004, against the St. Louis Cardinals. He appeared in 2 games for the Giants, working 1.2 innings for a 27.00 ERA.  Valdez was selected to the World squad for the All-Star Futures Game for 3 consecutive years (2003–05), held in conjunction with MLB All-Star festivities.

He spent all of 2005 in Norwich, and all of 2006 in Fresno, until injuring his arm.  He missed the entire 2007 season after undergoing Tommy John surgery on September 27, 2006.

Valdez returned to the Giants to appear in 17 games in 2007 and 48 games in 2009.

He was designated for assignment on January 14, 2010, by the Giants to make room on the 40 man roster for Aubrey Huff.

Toronto Blue Jays
On January 20, 2010, he was traded to the Toronto Blue Jays for cash considerations. He appeared in two games with the Blue Jays during the season, spending most of the season with the Las Vegas 51s.

Los Angeles Dodgers
On February 2, 2011, he was signed to a minor league contract by the Los Angeles Dodgers. The Dodgers assigned him to the AAA Albuquerque Isotopes. He opted out of his contract on July 18 and became a free agent. He had appeared in 38 games with the Isotopes with a 4–2 record, 3.58 ERA and 5 saves.

Texas Rangers
Valdez signed a minor league contract with the Texas Rangers on July 24, 2011. He was assigned to the Triple-A Round Rock Express. He became a free agent on November 2.

Oakland Athletics
On January 6, 2012, Valdez signed a minor league contract with the Oakland Athletics. He was granted free agency on November 3, 2012.

Personal life
When Valdez was first traded to the Giants, he went by the name Manny Mateo. While in his first year with the organization, however, his real name and real age (nine months older than he previously claimed) were revealed.

Valdez is single and has a son, Merkin Hanier, born August 11, 2006.

References

External links

1981 births
Living people
Albuquerque Isotopes players
Arizona League Athletics players
Dominican Republic expatriate baseball players in Canada
Dominican Republic expatriate baseball players in the United States
Fresno Grizzlies players
Gulf Coast Braves players
Hagerstown Suns players
Las Vegas 51s players

Major League Baseball pitchers
Major League Baseball players from the Dominican Republic
Norwich Navigators players
Round Rock Express players
Sacramento River Cats players
San Francisco Giants players
San Jose Giants players
Texas Rangers players
Toronto Blue Jays players